Televisión Universidad de Concepción, TVU, is a television channel of Chile.  It currently airs in Concepción on VHF channel 11.  Its headquarters are in Concepción, Chile, in the Universidad de Concepción.

TVU mostly aired documentaries and some low budget entertainment television shows.

Logos 

TVU
Spanish-language television stations
Television channels and stations established in 1997
Mass media in Concepción, Chile